Oprişeşti may refer to several villages in Romania:

 Oprişeşti, a village in Răchitoasa Commune, Bacău County
 Oprişeşti, a village in Balșa Commune, Hunedoara County